The 2022 Walsall Metropolitan Borough Council election took place on 5 May 2022 to elect members of Walsall Council. This was on the same day as other local elections. 21 of the 60 seats were up for election, with 1 ward (Willenhall South) electing 2 councillors.

Background
Since its creation in 1974, Walsall has varied between the Conservatives and Labour. Between 1973 and 2004, Walsall had been under Labour control from 1973 to 1976, 1980 to 1982, 1988 to 1992, 1995 to 1996, and 1999 to 2000. It was then under Conservative control between 2004 and 2011, before reverting to no overall control and being retaken by the Conservatives in 2019. In the 2021 elections, the Conservatives gained 5 seats with 54.1% of the vote, Labour lost 3 with 36.3%, and the Liberal Democrats lost their 2 seats on the council with 2.5%.

The seats up for election this year were last elected in 2018. In that election, the Conservatives gained 5 seats, Labour lost 2, and UKIP lost their 3 seats on the council.

Previous council composition 

Changes:
 May 2021: Douglas James leaves Labour to sit as an independent
 July 2021: Harbans Sarohi (Labour) dies; by-election held in December, but winner unable to take seat
 December 2021: Sean Coughlan (Labour) resigns; seat left vacant until 2022 elections

Results

Results by ward
An asterisk indicates an incumbent councillor.

Aldridge Central and South

Aldridge North and Walsall Wood

Bentley and Darlaston North

Birchills Leamore

Blakenall

Bloxwich East

Bloxwich West

Brownhills

Darlaston South

Paddock

Palfrey

Pelsall

Pheasey Park Farm

Pleck

Rushall-Shelfield

Short Heath

St. Matthews

Streetly

Willenhall North

Willenhall South

References

Walsall
Walsall Council elections